The Goodies Sing Songs From the Goodies was the 1974 debut LP record released by The Goodies. It was initially issued in January 1974 as The Goodies Sing Songs From the Goodies (Decca catalogue number SKL 5175), and was then later reissued in May 1975, retitled as The World of the Goodies with a different cover picture (Decca catalogue number SPA 416), as part of Decca's extensive World Of... series.

The album consisted mainly of re-recordings of songs that Bill Oddie had originally composed as incidental music for the TV series. It was produced by Miki Antony "despite interference from Bill Oddie". All songs were written by Oddie, with the exception of "Sparrow Song" (written by Graeme Garden) and "All Things Bright and Beautiful". The music was performed mainly by session musicians.

"Taking You Back" was arranged by Mike Gibbs, the musical director for The Goodies, and was taken directly from the soundtrack from the episode "Camelot" rather than being re-recorded.

Originally, Oddie intended to include a version of "Land of Hope and Glory" (from the episode "The Stolen Musicians") but ran into licensing problems with the song. "All Things Bright and Beautiful", a rock arrangement by Oddie and  Andrew Jackman of the well-known hymn, was included instead.

Track listing

Personnel
 Tim Brooke-Taylor – vocals
 Graeme Garden – vocals
 Bill Oddie – vocals, percussion, penny whistle
 Gary Boyle – lead guitar (on "Taking You Back")
 Mike Morgan – lead guitar
 Eric Ford – rhythm guitar
 Brian Cole – steel guitar
 Les Hurdle – bass guitar
 Chris Spedding – bass guitar (on "Taking You Back")
 Andrew Jackman – keyboard
 John Mitchell  – keyboard (on "Sunny Morning")
 Dave MacRae – keyboard
 Pete Zorn – alto saxophone
 Don Harper – violin
 Tony Carr – percussion
 John Marshall – drums (on "Taking You Back")
 Clem Cattini – drums

See also
 The Goodies discography

References

The Goodies albums
1974 debut albums
Decca Records albums